Macedonian Empire can refer to:
 the era of expansion of Macedonia under Philip II of Macedon and Alexander the Great, 359-323 BC
 the Empire established by Alexander the Great in 333-323 BC, see Conquests of Alexander the Great
the successor empires of the Diadochi
Ptolemaic Empire
Seleucid Empire

Empire